John of Capua also known as Johannes de Capua and Giovanni da Capua (born earlier than 1250, died later than 1300) was an Italian Jewish convert to Christianity, and a translator. He translated Rabbi Joel's Hebrew version of Kalilah wa-Dimnah into Latin under the title Directorium Vitae Humanae. His translation was the source from which that work became so widely spread in almost all European languages. It was edited by Joseph Derenbourg (Paris, 1887). John of Capua also translated Maimonides' Dietary and Ibn Zuhr's (Avenzoar's) Al-Taisir, on diseases.

References

 Brief biography of John of Capua at Jewish Virtual Library

External links
 Bibliotheca Augustana, Iohannes de Capua, Directorium humanae vitae
 Directorium humanae vitae, alias parabolae antiquorum sapientum, edited by Puntoni, 1884, at Google Books

Hebrew–Latin translators
Fabulists
Converts to Roman Catholicism from Judaism
Italian Roman Catholics
13th-century Latin writers
13th-century Italian Jews
13th-century translators
Jewish Italian writers